Riperata Kahutia (c.1839 – 10 June 1887) was a New Zealand tribal leader. Of Māori descent, she identified with the Te Aitanga-a-Mahaki iwi. She was born in Makauri or Taruheru, East Coast, New Zealand on c.1839. She is remembered as one of the original landowners of the area which is now Gisborne.

References

1839 births
1887 deaths
People from the Gisborne District
Te Aitanga-a-Māhaki people
19th-century women rulers